Alpha Condé (born 4 March 1938) is a Guinean politician who served as the fourth president of Guinea from 2010 to 2021.

Condé spent decades in opposition to a succession of regimes in Guinea, unsuccessfully running against President Lansana Conté in the 1993 and 1998 presidential elections and leading the Rally of the Guinean People (RPG), an opposition party. Standing again in the 2010 presidential election, Condé was elected president in a second round of voting. Upon his election, he said he would strengthen Guinea as a democracy and fight corruption.

When Condé took office in December 2010, he became the first freely elected president in the country's history. He was reelected in 2015 with about 58% of the vote, and again in 2020 with 59.5% after a constitutional referendum which allowed Condé to "reset" his term limit and seek two more terms. The move had been controversial and sparked massive protests before and after the referendum, which were brutally repressed. Condé's critics have claimed there was fraud in the 2015 and 2020 elections. On 30 January 2017, Condé succeeded Chad's Idriss Déby as head of the African Union. He was succeeded by Rwandan President Paul Kagame on 28 January 2018. On 5 September 2021, the Guinea Armed Forces arrested Condé and overthrew him.

Early life
Condé was born on 4 March 1938 in Boke in Lower Guinea. His parents were from Upper Volta.

Condé left for France at the age of 15. He was active in the National Union of Higher Education (SNESUP), the Association of Guinean Students in France (AEGF), and the Black African Students Federation in France (FEANF), of which he was claimed to be the Executive Coordinator of African National Groups (GN) from 1967 to 1975, overseeing the activities of the Directorate of FEANF.

Condé claimed to have written a master's thesis in political science, Le P.D.G. et le peuple de Guinée, in 1965.

Political career

Condé won 18 percent of the vote in Guinea's first multiparty presidential election, held on 19 December 1993. Lansana Conté, who had been president since a 1984 coup d'état, won the election with 51.7 percent of the vote. Condé's supporters alleged fraud in this election after the Supreme Court nullified results in the Kankan and Siguiri prefectures, where Condé had received more than 60 percent of the vote. Condé's supporters retorted with intimidation, ballot stuffing and violence in the Kankan and Siguiri prefectures resulting in the Supreme Court nullifying the results in those prefectures. In the 1998 presidential election, Condé ran again and received 17.6 percent of the vote, placing third behind Conté (56.1 percent) and Mamadou Boye Bâ (24.6 percent). On 16 December, two days after the poll, Condé was arrested and charged with trying to leave the country illegally; he was also charged with attempting to recruit forces to destabilize the government.

Controversy during his detention focused on whether he could be represented by foreign as well as domestic lawyers, and whether defense lawyers were being given full access to him in jail. Condé's trial, initially scheduled to begin in September 1999, did not begin until April 2000. Condé, along with 47 co-defendants, was charged with hiring mercenaries, planning to assassinate President Conté, and upsetting the state's security. Defense lawyers began by calling for the judge to immediately release their clients, then quit, saying that under the circumstances they could not properly make a defense. The trial was thus delayed several times, during which time Condé refused to speak in court, and his co-defendants denied all of the charges. The trial finally continued in August, and in mid-September Condé was sentenced to jail for five years.

However, Condé was released in May 2001 when he was pardoned by President Conté, with the condition that he was prohibited from engaging in political activities. Following his release, he left Guinea for France, returning in July 2005. Upon his return, some reports indicated that he intended to organize the RPG for the municipal elections held in late 2005, but later stated his intention to boycott them.

Following Conté's death and the 23 December 2008 military coup, Condé met with Moussa Dadis Camara, the President of the National Council for Democracy and Development (CNDD), on 27 December 2008. After the meeting, Condé said that the members of the CNDD junta were "patriots". Condé lobbied the CNDD junta to arrest and jail Condé's political rivals. Later, however, Condé opposed the junta after failing to push the CNDD junta to intimidate and disqualify  Condé's political rivals. Moussa Dadis Camara publicly exposed Condé's request to commit anti-democratic and anti-constitutional acts on his behalf.

2010 election

Condé stood again in the June–November 2010 presidential election. During the first round, he received 18 percent of the votes, while Cellou Dalein Diallo placed first with over 40 percent. On 15 November 2010 Condé was declared the winner of the second round with 52.5 percent. Imogen Rose-Smith from Institutional Investor said that his win was "surprising" given his "poor results" in previous elections and in the first round of this election.

After he was elected, Condé attempted to improve the mining law in Guinea, in order to reduce corruption in the sector and increase the country's benefit.

According to various documents that were allegedly leaked to the international NGO Global Witness, mining company Sable Mining was involved in helping Condé win the 2010 election in return for mining rights in the country. Global Witness reported that Sable Supported Condé's election campaign, organized logistics and strategic meetings, offered to loan him a helicopter, and paid bribe money to his son, Alpha Mohammed Condé, in order to secure mining permits in a number of areas, including Mount Nimba. In an email allegedly sent from Alpha Mohammed Condé to Sable in August 2010, he said that backing his father's campaign "will make my dad all the more comfortable to support our business partnerships".

Alleged assassination attempt
On 19 July 2011, the presidential residence was shelled, resulting in the death of a presidential guard and the injuries of two others. Condé survived the alleged assassination attempt. A former army chief and a member of the presidential guard were arrested hours after the two attacks on his house. The President later spoke to the country saying that "My house was attacked last night, but I congratulate the presidential guard who fought heroically from 3:10 until 5:00 before backup arrived." He also added that his plans for reform would not fail.

Three days later at least 41 soldiers were arrested for the assassination attempt. A government official said that many of those arrested had ties to the country's previous military rulers.

The United Nations reacted by saying that there was a greater need for military reforms in Guinea. The UN Special Representative for West Africa, Said Djinnit, said that the assault showed "weaknesses remain in Guinea's defence and security systems [and] reinforces the UN's determination to support the country's military reforms. I saw the damage...[the attack] clearly intended to kill the president."

2013 pre-election violence

Condé received criticism during week-long protests and violence in late February and early March 2013, after opposition supporters took to the streets of Conakry to peacefully protest against his attempts to rig the 2013 parliamentary election. The opposition coalition withdrew from the electoral process in mid-February, mainly due to Condé's insistence on using a South African firm, Waymark Infotech, to draw up the registered voter list to his political party's benefit.

The ensuing violence resulted in at least twenty deaths and hundreds injured due to Condé's security forces who used live ammunition to disperse the peaceful protesters.

Voting finally took place on 28 September. Local and international observers stated that the process was significantly flawed, stating that they observed ballot stuffing, voter intimidation, and minors casting votes. These organizational problems and irregularities led to a three-week delay in the announcement of the election results, which in turn led to further tension. Regional UN and EU representatives intervened and strongly recommended that the situation be addressed peacefully via the legal system.

2015 election
On 17 October 2015, Condé was selected for a second term and given 57.85 percent of the vote, an outright majority in the first round of voting. The election was marred by fraud and mismanagement. Cellou Dalein Diallo, who received the majority the vote, rejected the results because the vote had been rigged by Condé's government. Condé's government resorted again in intimidating voters, ballot stuffing, permitting minors to vote, altering the electoral map, and violence against the opposition supporters. However, the opposition did not file an official appeal. Condé was sworn in for his second term on 14 December 2015.

2016 corruption allegations

In 2016, French news organization FRANCE 24 released audio recordings that appear to prove that the mining company Rio Tinto paid Guinean government official and close acquaintance of the president  a sum of $10.5 million for mining rights in the Simandou mine. President Condé says that de Combret acted alone. Audio recordings do not implicate the president as there is no indication in it that he was not simply demanding down payment on the $700 million contract on behalf of the government with no payoff involved. Rio Tinto admitted to the payment in November 2016.

2019–2020 Guinean protests
The 2019–2020 Guinean protests were a series of bloody protests and mass civil unrest in Guinea against the rule of Conde that first broke out on 14 October 2019 against constitutional changes. During the violent clashes, over 90 people may have lost their lives.

2020 elections and third term 

Condé won a third term in October 2020 presidential election, with 59.5% of the vote. Condé stated that a March 2020 constitutional referendum allowed him to run despite a two-term limit. The opposition rejected the results because of allegations of fraud, and violent protests erupted across the country.

Overthrow 

On 5 September 2021, Condé was captured and overthrown by the military during the 2021 Guinean coup d'état. Promising to change the political landscape of Guinea, the military's Special Forces dissolved the constitution and shut the country’s land and air borders. Lieutenant-Colonel Mamady Doumbouya, the head of the Special Forces, said that government corruption and mismanagement precipitated the coup.

Condé was released from military detention and was sent to the residence of his wife, Djene Kaba Condé, in Conakry; she thanked the military junta for releasing her husband and "guaranteeing him treatment worthy of his rank".

On December 9, 2022, the US Treasury published a list of more than forty personalities targeted by sanctions for acts of corruption and human rights violations. Among the targets of the Office of Foreign Assets Control (OFAC), the financial control body of the Treasury Department is Alpha Condé..

Awards and decorations

National honours
:
 Grand Cross with Collar of the National Order of Merit

Foreign honours
:
 Grand Commander of the Order of the Most Ancient Welwitschia mirabilis (9 May 2019)
:
 Recipient of the Order of Friendship (28 September 2017)

Personal life 
Condé is a Muslim. He is married to Djene Kaba Condé. Condé has one son, Alpha Mohamed Condé.

Further reading

References

|-

1938 births
Guinean democracy activists
Guinean Muslims
Guinean prisoners and detainees
Living people
Mandinka
People from Boké
Presidents of Guinea
Prisoners and detainees of Guinea
Leaders ousted by a coup
Rally of the Guinean People politicians
Recipients of Guinean presidential pardons
Guinean expatriates in France
University of Paris alumni
Academic staff of Pantheon-Sorbonne University
Heads of government who were later imprisoned
Muslim socialists
21st-century Guinean politicians